Jeff Glover (born April 15, 1983) is an American submission wrestler and Brazilian Jiu-Jitsu black belt. He is known for his competitive achievements in both gi and no-gi competition.

Career 
Glover has competed in numerous exhibition matches, including at the inaugural World Jiu-Jitsu Expo where he scored a win over 7-time World black belt champion Caio Terra. Glover also holds a notable submission win over 6-time black belt World champion Robson Moura at the 2011 ADCC Submission Wrestling World Championship.

Glover is known for his particularly playful and unorthodox style of grappling. After their super-fight in 2012, Chris Haueter said of Glover’s grappling style – “It’s like grappling a monkey or a cat. He never loses balance.”

In 2014, Glover was a color commentator for Metamoris III and IV. At Metamoris IV he and Baret Yoshida were surprise competitors in the much-hyped "secret match", that ended in a draw.

Grapplers Quest record

As of 2012, Glover, a 27-time Grapplers Quest champion, held the best record in the event's history, having lost only 4 times over 8 years of active competition.

References

External links
Glover's Travels, Episode 1, Part 1
This Week in BJJ Episode 55 - Jeff Glover

1983 births
Sportspeople from Los Angeles
Living people
American practitioners of Brazilian jiu-jitsu
People awarded a black belt in Brazilian jiu-jitsu
People from East Los Angeles, California
World No-Gi Brazilian Jiu-Jitsu Championship medalists